The 2017–18 Swiss Challenge League (referred to as the Brack.ch Challenge League for sponsoring reasons) is the 15th season of the Swiss Challenge League, the second tier of competitive football in Switzerland, under its current name. The season started on 21 July 2017 and is scheduled to end on 21 May 2018. The winter break began on 11 December 2017 and the league resumed on 2 February 2018.

Participating teams
A total of 10 teams participate in the league. 2016–17 Swiss Challenge League champions Zürich were promoted to the 2017–18 Swiss Super League. They were replaced by FC Vaduz, who got relegated after finishing last-placed in the 2016–17 Swiss Super League. Le Mont was relegated after failing to renew their licence. They were replaced by Rapperswil-Jona, who won promotion from the 2016–17 Swiss Promotion League.

Stadia and locations

Personnel

Managerial changes

League table

Results

First and Second Round

Third and Fourth Round

Season statistics

Top goalscorers

1Chagas played 17 games for Rapperswil-Jona then signed for Servette.

References

External links
 
Soccerway

Swiss Challenge League
2
Swiss Challenge League seasons